Neidlinger is a surname. Notable people with the surname include:

Bruce Neidlinger, American game designer
Buell Neidlinger (born 1936), American cellist and double-bassist
Gustav Neidlinger (1910–1991), German opera singer
Jim Neidlinger (born 1964), American baseball player